Annette M. Deener was a brigadier general in the Maryland Army National Guard, where she served as the Chief of Staff. She was named to the Maryland Women's Hall of Fame.

Early life
She graduated from Western Maryland College, Frostburg State University, and United States Army War College.

Career
In 1978, she was commissioned as a Second Lieutenant. In 2004 she was the staff officer responsible for personnel at Maryland Joint Force Headquarters. From 1999 to 2001, she was advisor to the Defense Advisory Committee on Women in the Services (DACOWITS). In 2005, she was the Chief of Staff with the Maryland Army National Guard.

She retired from the United States Army. She was Chief of Staff for the Maryland Military Department.

References

External links
2016 Joint Chairmen's Report cover letter

Year of birth missing (living people)
Living people
Frostburg State University alumni
Maryland National Guard personnel
United States Army generals
United States Army War College alumni
Western Maryland College alumni
Created via preloaddraft